The Anatomy of Sharks may refer to:

Shark anatomy, article on the anatomy of the sea creature
The Anatomy of Sharks (EP), an EP by June of 44